Gopal Singh Chauhan is an Indian politician and a member of the Indian National Congress party.

Political career
In 1983, he started his political journey by becoming the chairman of Chanderi Janpad Panchayat, holding it till 2003.

He became an MLA for the first time in 2003 from Mungaoli. He went on to win a second term in 2013 from Chanderi. Again he achieved victory in third term in 2018 election from Chanderi. After Scindia left Congress party with his 22 supporter MLAs, he renovated party in the entire district along with neighbouring districts also.

Personal life
Kunwar. Gopal Singh Chauhan alias Daggi Raja hails from an illustrious feudal family (Jagir) of North Western Province of Bundelkhand. He is married to Kanwarani. Vijayalaxmi Raje Parmar of Ameeta Jagir, near Orai district UP and has two issues:

Kunwar. Vijay Pratap Singh Chauhan (Manu Raja), educated at Scindia School Gwalior, and pursuing his higher studies from Delhi University. ...
Baiji Lal- Karnika Singh, educated at Scindia Kanya Vidhyalaya, Gwalior, pursuing higher studies from Delhi University.

Daggi Raja's mother, hails from the Royal family of Madhopur in M.P. A family that stands as a blood relative to Maharaja. Chhatarsaal Singh Bundela of Bundelkhand.

See also
Madhya Pradesh Legislative Assembly
2013 Madhya Pradesh Legislative Assembly election
2003 Madhya Pradesh Legislative Assembly election

References

1960 births
Living people
Indian National Congress politicians from Madhya Pradesh